Timberland High School may refer to:
 Timberland High School (Missouri) - Wentzville, Missouri
 Timberland High School (South Carolina) - St. Stephen, South Carolina